Leif "Loket" Olsson, (born 12 July 1942) is a Swedish television host, sports journalist, radio host, and danceband singer. He is most recognized as the host of Bingolotto on TV4 between 1991 and 1999. Olsson got his big breakthrough as the host of the radio programme Radio Ringlinjen which started in 1978.  In 1992 Olsson was awarded the Lennart Hyland-Award as "most popular television personality of 1992" for his work on Bingolotto. Olsson is also known for hosting Svenska Idrottsgalan  between 2000 and 2002, and also for the economy show Deklarera med Loket och Unni.

Career

Handball referee
Olsson started his career as a handball referee in a career that included refereeing the handball semifinal between Yugoslavia and Romania at the 1972 Summer Olympics in Munich, Germany. Along with Hans Carlsson he also refereed the bronze match of the same tournament.

Radio Ringlinjen
Olsson got his big breakthrough as the host of the radio programme Radio Ringlinjen which was broadcast on Friday night in the late 1970s to the early 1990s. It became so popular that it was broadcast five nights a week. Olsson had a new topic for each show and let the listeners call in and tell their opinions about the topic. The show was broadcast on Sveriges Radio P1 between 1978 and 1991.

Bingolotto

Olsson is most known and loved for his hosting of the legendary game, lottery and entertainment show Bingolotto, which he created and pitched for TV4 and was host for at the first broadcasting of the show in 1989. This until Lasse Kronér took over the role as host in 1999. Bingolotto became one of the most watched programmes on Swedish television in the 1990s. During a special Christmas broadcast of Bingolotto at the Christmas of 1995 Bingolotto had 3,145 million viewers. After Olsson quit the show in 1999 ratings immediately dropped, Olsson returned as a guest host in 2004 and also in 2011. In 1992 Olsson was awarded the Lennart Hyland-Award as "most popular television personality of 1992" for his work on Bingolotto.

Other TV and film appearances
After Bingolotto Olsson has been hosting Svenska Idrottsgalan (Swedish Sports Awards) on SVT during a three-year period between 2000 and 2002 along with Kristin Kaspersen. In 2002 Olsson hosted Deklarera med Loket och Unni (Economy with Loket and Unni) on TV4. Olsson also made a cameo-appearance in the soap opera Tre Kronor on TV4. Olsson has also appeared as himself in several Swedish films such as Yrrol – en kolossalt genomtänkt film in 1994 and En på miljonen in 1995. He can be seen briefly, in footage from BingoLotto, in the music video for Ray of Light by Madonna.

Music
Olsson has also been an appreciated danceband singer and released several albums in the 1990s. His most sold music album was the danceband record Lokets favoriter and the single "Vart tog jultomten vägen?" ("Where did Santa Claus go?") which sold 250.000 ex.

References

External links

1942 births
Swedish television hosts
Swedish journalists
Swedish sports journalists
Swedish radio personalities
Dansband singers
Living people
Handball referees